The Baths Hall is an entertainment venue in Scunthorpe, North Lincolnshire, England. It hosts many types of entertainment, including live music, dance and comedy.

History
Situated at 59 Doncaster Road, the Scunthorpe building is a former public bath house dating from 1931. It has served as an entertainment venue since the 1970s. It was renovated and reopened in 2005 but closed to undergo a major re-build.

Bands that have played the venue include The Kinks, Status Quo, Ocean Colour Scene, The Damned, The Bluetones and The Levellers. The late DJ John Peel regularly appeared at the hall.

The previous Conservative Council closed the Baths, intending to demolish it and replace it with private housing.
In 2007 the Conservative Council was replaced by a Labour Council, which honoured its manifesto commitment to save the Baths. It rebuilt the hall, retaining its 1931 frontage, and created a modern entertainment venue. The Hall is able to seat a maximum of 1,200 people, and 2,000 standing.

The building's design, by North Lincolnshire Council's architects, incorporates environmentally friendly technology, including a rainwater harvesting system for use in the lavatories.

The Baths Hall is run by North Lincolnshire Council.
It re-opened on the 11 November 2011 with comedian Bill Bailey and guests performing on the opening evening. Bailey commented that this was the first time that he had been the first act to perform at a new venue. He said about The Baths Hall: "It's got a brilliant atmosphere. I love the type of venues that have a large auditorium with access on either sides. You look out and you see this sweep of seats. It reminds me a lot of very traditional concert halls. It's new but it looks very traditional at the same time. I've never actually opened a venue before so this is a first for me".

Images

References

External links
 Baths Hall Website

Buildings and structures in Scunthorpe
Music venues in Lincolnshire